Nathan Glantz was an early 20th-century American jazz bandleader.

Nathan Glantz and His Orchestra
Nathan Glantz and His Orchestra had a number of aliases. The orchestra produced many recordings, including the following compositions:

 June Night (1924)
 Love Is Just A Gamble (1924)
 Oh Baby (1924)
 Don't Bring Lulu (1925)
 Bye Bye Blackbird (1926)
 Talking To The Moon (1926)
 Diane (1927)

References

External links
Nathan Glantz and His Orchestra on Spotify

American jazz bandleaders
Dixieland bandleaders
Year of birth missing
Year of death missing